John Calvert may refer to:

John Calvert (1726–1804), British politician, MP for Tamworth, Wendover and Hertford
John Calvert (died 1844) (c. 1758–1844), British politician, MP for Tamworth, Huntingdon, St Albans and Malmesbury
John Calvert (mine owner) (1812–1890), a Yorkshireman who came to South Wales as a civil engineering contractor and became an important developer of the Rhondda coalfield.
John Calvert (magician) (1911–2013), American magician
John Calvert (radio), radio commercials producer and voiceover artist
John Calvert Griffiths, Attorney General of Hong Kong
John Calvert (scholar), US scholar of Islamism at Creighton University